1998 Japanese Super Cup was the Japanese Super Cup competition. The match was played at National Stadium in Tokyo on March 14, 1998. Kashima Antlers won the championship.

Match details

References

Japanese Super Cup
1998 in Japanese football
Júbilo Iwata matches
Kashima Antlers matches